Kaisen may refer to:

People
 Kaisen Joki (快川紹喜, 1500–1582), Japanese Buddhist priest and monk
 Jane Jin Kaisen (born 1980), Danish visual artist and filmmaker
 Olivier Kaisen (born 1983), Belgian cyclist
 Wilhelm Kaisen (1887–1979), German politician

Other uses
 Kaisen: Outbreak, a professional wrestling event

See also
 Jujutsu Kaisen, a Japanese manga series
 Kaizen, a Japanese business term